Toby Weathersby (born September 19, 1996) is a former American football offensive tackle. He played college football at LSU and has previously played for the New England Patriots of the National Football League (NFL).

Early years
Weathersby attended Westfield High School in Houston, Texas. He committed to play football for the LSU Tigers in February 2015.

College career
Weathersby played at LSU from 2015 to 2017. After his junior season in 2017, he chose to forgo his senior season and enter the 2018 NFL Draft. He played in 31 games for the Tigers over three years.

Professional career

Philadelphia Eagles
Weathersby signed with the Philadelphia Eagles as an undrafted free-agent on May 11, 2018. He was waived/injured on September 1, 2018 and was placed on injured reserve. He was released on October 2, 2018.

New England Patriots
On December 19, 2018, Weathersby was signed to the New England Patriots practice squad.

Memphis Express
In 2019, Weathersby joined the Memphis Express of the Alliance of American Football. The league ceased operations in April 2019.

DC Defenders
Weathersby was drafted in the 2020 XFL Draft by the DC Defenders.

Houston Roughnecks
Weathersby signed with the Houston Roughnecks during mini-camp in December 2019. He was waived on February 4, 2020, before the start of the regular season.

References

External links
LSU Tigers bio

1996 births
Living people
Players of American football from Houston
American football offensive tackles
LSU Tigers football players
Philadelphia Eagles players
New England Patriots players
Memphis Express (American football) players
DC Defenders players
Houston Roughnecks players